Jahalda is a village in Paschim Medinipur, West Bengal, India.

Jahalda is the main market place for villagers of Bamnasai, Palashi, Uttar Asda, Apartiya, Amarda, Nahanjra, Purunda, Bimbal Titiya, Baharda, Sarrang, Bansichak, Tentulia, Kasmuli, Poralda, Haripur, Brahman Khalisa, etc. A big super market is present over there.

Economy
Jahalda B.G.V.B. Bank
Jahalda P.O
Jahalda rice-meal
Jahalda ice cream factory
Jahalda State Bank of India  
JAHALDA SUPER MARKET

Culture
JAHALDA COMMUNITY HALL                     
JAHALDA SHITALA MAYER MANDIR

Education
In this area, the most popular government school is Jahalda High School. Besides that two public schools are available 1) Nabapallab 2) Maa Sharada Sishu Siksha Niketan. The atmosphere of education has been improving day by day. Students from Jahalda are working across the world.

 Villages in Paschim Medinipur district